The 2018 New York City Marathon was a marathon race held in New York City, United States, which took place on November 4, 2018. It was the 48th edition of the New York City Marathon, which is organised by New York Road Runners. The men's race was won by Lelisa Desisa, who held off a late challenge at the finish by Shura Kitata. The women's race was won by Mary Keitany, her fourth win of the event. Both Desisa and Keitany recorded the second fastest times on the course. In the wheelchair races, Daniel Romanchuk (1:36:21) and Switzerland's Manuela Schär (1:50:27) won the men's and women's races, respectively. A total of 52,704 runners finished the race, comprising 30,592 men and 22,112 women.

Course

The New York City Marathon starts at Fort Wadsworth on Staten Island, New York City. The first two miles of the course stay on the island, before the runners cross the Verrazzano-Narrows Bridge into Brooklyn. The streets in this borough are flat and the runners remain here until mile 12. The runners then enter Queens before crossing the Queensboro Bridge at mile 13.

After crossing the bridge, the runners enter Manhattan and run down First Avenue. The runners then enter The Bronx for miles 19 and 20 and pass the 'Entertainment Zone' which includes bands and dancers. The course then re-enters Manhattan for the final . After running through Harlem, there is a slight uphill section along Fifth Avenue before it flattens out and runs parallel to Central Park. The course then enters the park around mile 24, passes Columbus Circle at mile 25 and re-enters the park for the finish.

Field
The "hot favorite" for the men's race was Geoffrey Kamworor, who had won the previous edition in 2:10:53, three seconds ahead of Wilson Kipsang. Kamworor had been training with Eliud Kipchoge, who Ken Belson of The New York Times called the "greatest marathoner ever", in the lead up to the race. Also in the race were 2013 and 2015 Boston Marathon winner Lelisa Desisa, Shura Kitata, who came second at the 2018 London Marathon, and 2017 London winner Daniel Wanjiru. In the elite women's field, there were 11 former winners of the race, including the defending champion Shalane Flanagan. Others in the field included Des Linden, winner of the 2018 Boston Marathon, Mary Keitany, runner-up in the previous edition, winner of the 2014, 2015, and 2016 editions, and who also held the quickest personal best time of 2:17:01 in the field, and Vivian Cheruiyot, winner of the 2018 London Marathon.

Race summary
In the women's race, a group of 24 runners remained in the lead group until just before the halfway point when Keitany, along with others such as Rhama Tusa and Netsanet Gudeta, broke away. A group of eight, led by Tusa and Gudeta, went through halfway in 1:15:49. Tusa, Gudeta, Keitany broke away from the group leaving a chasing pack, containing the likes of Cheruiyot, Flanagan, and Molly Huddle. Tusa was also dropped by Keitany, who ran a second-half split of 1:06:58 to win in a time of 2:22:48, just 17 seconds off the course record. Meanwhile, the chasing group managed to catch Tusa, and Cheruiyot, who reportedly ran with a hamstring injury, finished second in 2:26:02 and Flanagan finished third, 20 seconds behind. For her victory, Keitany was awarded $100,000, with an additional $45,000 for finishing in under 2:23:00.

The elite men's race was "far more competitive". Kitata pushed the pace in the first half of the race, with Desisa and Tamirat Tola also contributing to the pace-setting. A leading group comprising Desisa, Kitata, Tola, Kamworor, and Festus Talam went through halfway in 1:03:55. By this point, Wanjiru had been dropped. Kamworor then moved to the front of the group and made a move, with Desisa following. In the last , however, Kitata was able to catch Kamworor and closed in on Desisa, who was able to increase the pace to take the win in 2:05:59, the second fastest time in the race's history. Kitata was just two seconds back. Kamworor finished third in 2:06:26. Like the women's race, Desisa won $100,000 and $45,000 for finishing in under 2:06:00.

In the wheelchair men's race, Daniel Romanchuk went into the lead over the Verrazzano-Narrows Bridge, and was joined by David Weir and Marcel Hug, as they broke clear from the rest of the field. The race came down to a sprint which was won by Romanchuk, who completed the race in a time of 1:36:21, one second ahead of Hug and two seconds ahead of Weir. Romanchuk became the first American and the joint youngest winner of the wheelchair men's category in the race's history. His win also came after victory in the Chicago Marathon on October 7, where he also finished ahead of Hug. In the women's race, Tatyana McFadden, who was using a borrowed wheelchair as hers was damaged, took an early lead and led for the first half of the race. After an hour of racing, McFadden and Manuela Schär were clear of the rest of the field. Entering into Central Park, Schär dropped McFadden to win in a time of 1:50:27, with McFdden in second in 1:50:48 and Lihong Zou in third in 1:56:14.

Results
Results reported by NBC Sports and New York Road Runners.

References 

Results
TCS New York City Marathon 2018. New York Road Runners. Retrieved 2020-05-05.
2018 New York Marathon Results. NBC Sports. Retrieved 2020-05-05.

2018
New York City Marathon
Marathon
New York City Marathon